Mosconi may refer to:

 Alain Mosconi (born 1949), French swimmer, Olympic medalist and previous world record holder
 Antonio Mosconi (1866–1955), Italian politician
 Enrique Mosconi (1877–1940), Argentine military engineer
 Germano Mosconi (1932–2012), sports journalist and television anchorman
 Judah Leon ben Moses Mosconi (born 1328), Bulgarian scholar and Talmudist
 Lisa Mosconi, Italian American neuroscientist
 Paolo Mosconi (1914–1982), Italian archbishop, Vatican diplomat 
 Willie Mosconi (1913–1993), American professional pool player from Philadelphia, Pennsylvania
 Mosconi Cup, an annual nine-ball pool tournament contested between teams representing Europe and the United States since 1994, named in honor of Willie Mosconi
Mosconi, a restaurant in Luxembourg

See also 
 Moscone (disambiguation)